Major General Frederick Arthur Maguire,  (28 March 1888 – 10 June 1953) was an Australian physician, gynaecologist, and soldier, who spent much of his career with the Royal Prince Alfred Hospital, the University of Sydney and in the service of the Australian Army Medical Corps. Maguire served as Director General Australian Army Medical Services from 1941 to 1942 during the Second World War, and was later a founding member and chairman of the Australian Regional Council of the Royal College of Obstetricians and Gynaecologists.

Maguire was a noted Freemason and served as Grand Master of the United Grand Lodge of New South Wales and the Australian Capital Territory from 1933 to 1935 and 1944 to 1945.

References

1888 births
1953 deaths
Military personnel from New South Wales
Australian Companions of the Distinguished Service Order
Australian Companions of the Order of St Michael and St George
Australian Fellows of the Royal College of Surgeons
Australian Freemasons
Australian generals
Australian gynaecologists
Australian health and wellness writers
Australian military doctors
Australian military personnel of World War I
Australian Army personnel of World War II
Fellows of the Royal Australasian College of Surgeons
Medical doctors from Sydney
Sydney Medical School alumni
Academic staff of the University of Sydney